Independence is an unincorporated community in Barbour County, West Virginia, United States. Independence is located south of Philippi on County Route 30 near the Tygart Valley River. The community is centered on and named for the Independence School there.

References 

Unincorporated communities in Barbour County, West Virginia
Unincorporated communities in West Virginia